Fator is a surname. Notable people with the surname include:

 Laverne Fator (1899–1936), American jockey
 Mark Fator (1904–1952), American jockey
 Terry Fator (born 1965), American ventriloquist, impressionist, stand-up comedian, and singer